The idea of a Universal reason implies an underpinning system of perception and conception of all forms of complexity. Many philosophers over the years have dealt with or relate to this idea in their writings. In recent years, the idea of a universal reason has been brought up in discussions of artificial intelligence and other topics regarding consciousness for it provides a stage of universality for a mechanistic description of thought.

See also
 Consciousness
 Gödel, Escher, Bach
 Hegel
 Douglas Hofstadter
 I Am a Strange Loop
 Logic
 Language
 Mind
 Nous
 Rationality
 Reason
 Reasoning
 State of nature
 Stoicism

Concepts in metaphysics
Concepts in the philosophy of mind
Teleology